Ray Sault (born 29 July 1952) is  a former Australian rules footballer who played with Fitzroy in the Victorian Football League (VFL).

Notes

External links 
		

Living people
1952 births
Australian rules footballers from Victoria (Australia)
Fitzroy Football Club players
Koroit Football Club players